Sigerfjord is a village in Sortland Municipality in Nordland county, Norway. The village is located on the island of Hinnøya by the entrance to the Sigerfjorden. Sigerfjord Church is located in this village.

References 

Sortland
Villages in Nordland
Populated places of Arctic Norway
Vesterålen